Something About Amelia is a 1984 television film about psychological trauma caused in a family by a father's molestation of his daughter.

The film stars Ted Danson, Glenn Close, Roxana Zal, and Missy Francis.

It was the most-watched network television show in the United States for the week of January 9–15, 1984.

It received eight Emmy nominations in 1984, and won in three categories, for Outstanding Drama/Comedy Special (Leonard Goldberg / Michele Rappaport), Outstanding Supporting Actress in a Limited Series (Roxana Zal) and for Outstanding Writing in a Limited Series or a Special (William Hanley).

The movie was also nominated for four Golden Globes and won two, for Best Miniseries or Television Film and for Best Performance by an Actor in a Limited Series or a Motion Picture Made for Television (Ted Danson).

Plot summary
Shame and fear have kept Amelia Bennett silent about the sexual molestation she has been suffering at the hands of her father, Steven. But as Amelia starts to believe that Steven might harm her younger sibling in similar ways, she unburdens herself of her awful secret. Confronted with this horrifying piece of news, Steven's wife, Gail, refuses to believe it is true, and he professes his innocence. But as new details emerge, the family is shaken to its core.

Cast
 Ted Danson as Steven Bennett
 Glenn Close as Gail Bennett
 Olivia Cole as Ruth Walters
 Roxana Zal as Amelia Bennett
 Lane Smith as Officer Dealy
 Jane Kaczmarek as Mrs. Hall
 Missy Francis as Beth Bennett
 Kevin Conway as Dr. Kevin Farley

See also
1984 in film
1984 in American television
Incest in film and television

References

External links

 

1984 films
1984 television films
1984 drama films
ABC network original films
American drama television films
Best Miniseries or Television Movie Golden Globe winners
Films scored by Mark Snow
Films about child abuse
Films directed by Randa Haines
Incest in film
Incest in television
Primetime Emmy Award for Outstanding Made for Television Movie winners